Dipoena nigra is a species of cobweb spider in the family Theridiidae. It is found in the USA, Canada, and Mexico.

References

Theridiidae
Articles created by Qbugbot
Spiders described in 1882